Floyd Hudgins (March 11, 1930 – May 11, 2010) was an American politician. He served as a Democratic member for the 15th district of the Georgia State Senate.

Life and career 
Hudgins was born in Etowah County, Alabama, the son of Ollie Belle Strickland and William Lonnie Hudgins. He attended St. Clair County High School.

In 1969, Hudgins was elected to represent the 15th district of the Georgia State Senate. He served until 1989, when he succeeded by Gary Parker.

Hudgins died in May 2010, at the age of 80.

References 

1930 births
2010 deaths
People from Etowah County, Alabama
Democratic Party Georgia (U.S. state) state senators
20th-century American politicians